Family Club is an Italian TV Block aired every day from 10:00pm to 1:00am on K2 and Frisbee, airing Discovery-branded documentaries like How It's Made and How Do They Do It?.

Programming 
The block's current programming is different on both channels. On K2 it's directed at males with documentaries and has programs taken from its sister channels Motor Trend and Animal Planet, while on Frisbee it's directed at women with shows about food and airs shows from Food Network.

Current programming 

 How It's Made
 How Do They Do It?
 Come fanno gli animali
 La mia nuova casetta dei giochi
 Extreme Cake Wars
 Kids Baking Championship

Previous programming 

 Just For Laughs Gags
 Wipeout
 WWE Afterburn
 Parrucchieri per cani

References 

Italian television shows
Italian television news shows